Reflexisphodrus is a genus of ground beetles in the family Carabidae. There are about 12 described species in Reflexisphodrus, found in China and Mongolia.

Species
These 12 species belong to the genus Reflexisphodrus:

 Reflexisphodrus eugrammus (Vereschagina, 1989)  (China)
 Reflexisphodrus formosus (Semenov, 1895)  (China and Mongolia)
 Reflexisphodrus gracilior Lassalle & Marcilhac, 1999  (China)
 Reflexisphodrus graciliusculus (Vereschagina, 1989)  (China)
 Reflexisphodrus lanzouicus Lassalle & Marcilhac, 1999  (China)
 Reflexisphodrus marginipennis (Fairmaire, 1891)  (China)
 Reflexisphodrus ollivieri Lassalle, 2007  (China)
 Reflexisphodrus refleximargo (Reitter, 1894)  (Mongolia)
 Reflexisphodrus reflexipennis (Semenov, 1889)  (China and Mongolia)
 Reflexisphodrus remondorum Lassalle & Marcilhac, 1999  (China)
 Reflexisphodrus stenocephalus (Vereschagina, 1989)  (China)
 Reflexisphodrus wuduensis Lassalle & Marcilhac, 1999  (China)

References

Platyninae